Niall Coll (born 25 August 1963) is an Irish Roman Catholic prelate and theologian who has served as Bishop of Ossory since 22 January 2023.

Early life and education 
Coll was born in Letterkenny, County Donegal, on 25 August 1963, one of four children to Willie and Kathleen Coll. He grew up in nearby St Johnston and attended secondary school at St Eunan's College.

Coll began studying for the priesthood at St Patrick's College, Maynooth, in 1981, completing a Bachelor of Arts in history and geography from the National University of Ireland, Maynooth, in 1984, and a Bachelor of Divinity from the Pontifical University in 1987.

He was ordained a priest for the Diocese of Raphoe on 3 July 1988.

Presbyteral ministry 
Following ordination, Coll completed a licentiate in dogmatic theology from the Pontifical Gregorian University in Rome in 1989, before returning to Ireland for his first diocesan assignment, as a teacher at St Eunan's College until 1991. He subsequently obtained a higher diploma in education from Trinity College, Dublin, in 1992, before returning to Rome to complete doctoral studies in Christology at the Pontifical Gregorian University.

Coll returned to Ireland once again in 1995, upon his appointment as a lecturer at St Patrick's, Carlow College. He returned to the Diocese of Raphoe in 1998, serving as curate in Dungloe and simultaneously as chaplain and teacher at Pobalscoil na Rosann.

In 2001, Coll was appointed professor in religious studies and religious education at St Mary’s University College in Belfast. He returned to the Diocese of Raphoe once again in 2020, when he was appointed as parish priest of Drumholm (centred on Ballintra), before being appointed parish priest of Tawnawilly (centred on Donegal) the following year. Coll also served on the diocesan pastoral council and coordinated the promotion of the diocesan pastoral plan upon its publication in April 2022.

In an interview with The Irish Catholic in 2018, he emphasised the importance of intelligence and reason in faith development.

In conjunction with his priestly appointments, Coll has conducted retreats for clergy, contributed to publications including Doctrine and Life, The Furrow, Irish Theological Quarterly and The Tablet, and edited the Catholic school ethos journal Le Chéile. He has also edited a collection of essays evaluating Ireland's response to the Second Vatican Council.

On a national level, Coll has also served as a member of the Inter-Church Committee of the Irish Council of Churches.

Episcopal ministry 
Coll was appointed Bishop-elect of Ossory by Pope Francis on 28 October 2022.

He was consecrated by his predecessor, the Archbishop of Dublin, Dermot Farrell, on 22 January 2023 in St Mary's Cathedral, Kilkenny.

Bibliography

References

External links
 Father Niall Coll on Catholic-Hierarchy.org
 Bishop-elect Niall Coll on GCatholic

1963 births
Living people
People from Letterkenny
Irish Roman Catholic theologians
Roman Catholic bishops of Ossory
People educated at St Eunan's College
Pontifical Gregorian University alumni
Pontifical Irish College alumni
Alumni of Trinity College Dublin
Alumni of St Patrick's College, Maynooth
Bishops appointed by Pope Francis
21st-century Roman Catholic bishops in Ireland